Season three of Australia's Next Top Model premiered on 27 March 2007 on Fox8. Former model and designer of swimsuit collection Tigerlily, Jodhi Meares replaced Erika Heynatz as the host of the show after the latter was involved in a breach of contract following her appearance on the Seven Network series It Takes Two in 2006. Alex Perry was the only original judge to return in the third series. Also joining the panel for the first time were international photographer Jez Smith, and ex-model and TV personality Charlotte Dawson. Fashion photographer Georges Antoni and fashion producer Victoria Fisher were replaced this year by these new judges.

The prizes for this season included a one-year modelling contract with Priscilla's Model Management in Sydney, a trip to New York City to meet with another top model booker, a Ford Fiesta XR4, a contract to be the face of Napoleon Perdis for one year, and an eight-page fashion spread in Vogue Australia.

The winner of the competition was 18-year-old Alice Burdeu from Melbourne.

Series summary

Format changes
The show went underwent a series of changes this season, beginning with the introduction of a fan favourite voting system. Shortly after a new episode aired, Foxtel users were able to cast their vote via the Red Button or SMS for who they thought was "Australia's Favourite Top Model". Jordan Loukas was later announced to be the winner of the fan vote during the show's finale.

Live finale
For the first time in the show's history, the finale was held live. Viewers were allowed to have a say in who won the overall prize of Australia's Next Top Model by phoning in or using SMS to vote for either Alice or Steph H. during the lead-up week to the finale. The viewers vote counted for 15% of the total vote to determine the winner while the other 85% was determined through the vote of eight judges, including representatives from Vogue Australia, Priscilla's Model Management and Napoleon Perdis.

Age requirement
The minimum age requirement for participation in the show was still around 18 years old and above to compete. Starting this season, the age had been lowered to 18 below with the minimum age began at 16 years old. Participants who were below 18 must go to bed at 10:00 pm with a curfew hours began at 10:00 pm to 6:00 am.

Cast

Contestants
(Ages stated are at start of contest)

Judges
 Jodhi Meares
 Alex Perry
 Charlotte Dawson
 Jez Smith

Other cast members
Jonathan Pease – style director, model mentor

Episodes

Results

 The contestant won a reward challenge.
 The contestant quit the competition
 The contestant was eliminated
 The contestant won the reward challenge and was eliminated
 The contestant won the competition

Final votes

Average call-out order
Final two is not included.

Bottom two

 The contestant was eliminated after her first time in the bottom two
 The contestant was eliminated after her second time in the bottom two
 The contestant was eliminated after her third time in the bottom two
 The contestant quit the competition
 The contestant was eliminated in the final judging and placed as the runner-up

Notes

References

External links
 Official website

Australia's Next Top Model seasons
2007 Australian television seasons
Television shows filmed in Australia
Television shows filmed in Los Angeles